Mill Stream Glacier is a tributary glacier, about  wide, flowing west between the Supporters Range and Otway Massif in Antarctica to enter Mill Glacier. It was named by the New Zealand Geological Survey Antarctic Expedition of 1961–62 in association with Mill Glacier.

References

Glaciers of Dufek Coast